Chango or El Chango may refer to:

People
 José de Jesús Méndez Vargas (born 1974), nickname El Chango, alleged Mexican drug cartel leader
 Chango Spasiuk (born 1968), Argentine chamamé musician and accordion player
 Juan Carlos Cárdenas (born 1945), nickname El Chango, Argentine footballer and coach
 Héctor Icazuriaga (born 1955), nickname El Chango, Secretary of Intelligence of Argentina

Arts and entertainment
 Chango Family, a band based in Ontario, Canada
 "Chango", a song by Devo off of Hardcore Devo: Volume Two
 El Chango de los Dos Plátanos, a track on the 2003 Panda album La Revancha Del Príncipe Charro

Other
 Chango (company), a Toronto/NYC based ad retargeting and online media planning company
 Chango people, a tribe of native South Americans who inhabited the coast of Peru and Chile
 Changó, thunder god in Yoruba mythology
 Chang-o, Moon goddess in Chinese mythology
 Sangu language (Gabon), a language spoken by the Masangu people of Gabon

See also
 
 Changgo, a Korean musical instrument
 Csángó, a Hungarian minority in Romania
 Monkey (disambiguation), Spanish for